Raúl Pedro Sánchez Soya (26 October 1933 – 28 February 2016) was a Chilean football defender who played for Chile in the 1962 FIFA World Cup. He also played for Santiago Wanderers, Everton and Colo-Colo.

References

External links
 
FIFA profile

1933 births
2016 deaths
Sportspeople from Valparaíso
Chilean footballers
Chile international footballers
Association football defenders
Chilean Primera División players
Santiago Wanderers footballers
Colo-Colo footballers
Rangers de Talca footballers
Everton de Viña del Mar footballers
1962 FIFA World Cup players